This article lists all dukedoms, extant, extinct, dormant, abeyant, or forfeit, in the peerages of England, Scotland, Great Britain, Ireland and the United Kingdom.

Introduction of dukedoms into England

Edward III of England created the first three dukedoms of England (Cornwall, Lancaster, and Clarence). His eldest son Edward, the Black Prince, was created Duke of Cornwall, the first English Duke, in 1337. Two weeks after the Prince's death the dukedom was recreated for his 9-year-old son Richard of Bordeaux, who would eventually succeed his grandfather as Richard II. The Dukes of Cornwall are not numbered as part of their style.

The second dukedom was originally given to Henry of Grosmont, 1st Duke of Lancaster, but upon his death was re-created for the 3rd son of Edward III, John of Gaunt, 1st Duke of Lancaster. On that same day Edward III also created a dukedom for his second son, Lionel of Antwerp, 1st Duke of Clarence.  When Richard II reached majority, he created dukedoms for his last two uncles on the same day: Edmund of Langley, 1st Duke of York, and Thomas of Woodstock, 1st Duke of Gloucester.

Originally, dukedoms were created for those who had royal blood, either by descent or marriage (see below, list of surnames).  By the end of the Middle Ages, traditionally marked by the Battle of Bosworth Field on 22 August 1485, a total of 31 dukedoms (with 16 distinct titles) had been created; yet only those of Cornwall, Lancaster and Suffolk remained. The Duchy of Cornwall was permanently associated with the heir apparent, and the Duchy of Lancaster became Crown property.

The first Duke of Norfolk had died in the battle of Bosworth Field in 1485. Three decades later the Dukedom of Norfolk was restored to his son by Henry VIII. Thus when Elizabeth I came to power the only living duke was Thomas Howard, 4th Duke of Norfolk. Elizabeth did not create any dukes, and she beheaded Thomas Howard at the age of 36 for plotting to wed Mary, Queen of Scots and overthrow her. By 1572, this class of peerage was extinct, and there were no dukes in the last 30 years of her reign. The extant dukedoms in the Peerage of England were all created (or restored, in the cases of Norfolk and Somerset) in the Stuart period, beginning with James I's re-creation of the dukedom of Buckingham in 1623 for George Villiers.

With the possible exception of the Duchy of Cornwall and the Duchy of Lancaster (which come with great territories attached), all ducal titles in England have been created and held by royal patent or charter, and not by tenure. As a result, the rules of succession to a ducal title are usually explicitly laid out in the patent, and are not necessarily consistent, nor do they coincide with common inheritance laws on property.  For instance, an heir does not usually inherit the ducal title by virtue of being the heir of the last holder, but by virtue of descent from the first person to whom the title was given, so a full-blood daughter of a duke may be superseded by a half-blood male relative who can prove direct descent from the first holder.

Dukedoms in the Peerage of England, 1337–1707
 
 

(continues below Scotland as Dukedoms of Great Britain)

Dukedoms in the Peerage of Scotland, 1398–1707

Dukedoms in the Peerage of Great Britain, 1707–1801
 
 

(continues below Ireland as Dukedoms of the United Kingdom)

Dukedoms in the Peerage of Ireland, 1661–1868

Dukedoms in the Peerage of the United Kingdom, 1801–present

See also
British nobility
Dukes in the United Kingdom
Royal dukedoms in the United Kingdom
List of dukes in the peerages of Britain and Ireland for a list of present and extant dukedoms in the peerages of the Kingdom of England, Kingdom of Scotland, Kingdom of Great Britain, Kingdom of Ireland, United Kingdom of Great Britain and Ireland, and the United Kingdom of Great Britain and Northern Ireland 1927 and after. 
 Duchies in England
List of Marquessates
List of Earldoms
List of viscountcies
List of baronies.

References

Britain and Ireland